Bombus crotchii, commonly called Crotch's bumblebee, is a species of bumblebee named after the entomologist George Robert Crotch. It is classified as endangered due to the impacts of pesticides, climate change, and human development.

Description 
Crotch's bumblebee is characterized as a short- or medium- tongue length species. This species could be confused with Bombus caliginosus, Bombus occidentalis, and Bombus vandykei, as they have similar appearances to Crotch's bumblebee. B. crotchii males are generally present from May to September with their peak occurring in July. Workers of this species are active from April to August and queen bees are active for only two months from March until May; the peak of worker activity is between May and June, while queens reach maximum activity in April. Bees of this species all have a square-shaped face and a rounded ankle on the mid leg. Bumblebee abdomen segments are numbered T1-T6.

Queens and workers (females) have a black head and face, and display black color on their mid and bottom thorax and between their wing bases. T1 is all black or black in the middle portion. T2 is usually yellow, and sometimes black medially. T3-5 are black or orange and T6 displays black coloring. Queens and workers have a similar appearance, with the main difference being their lengths. Queens are 23-24mm long and workers are 14-18mm long.

Drones (males) have a slightly different appearance from queens and workers. They display yellow hair on their faces, and a black stripe mid thorax. The front of the drone abdomen should have a yellow coloring, and the rest of their abdomen is expected to be predominantly black and red. Male abdomens are shorter compared to female and queen abdomens.

Habitat 
This species lives primarily in California in the United States. Crotch's bumblebee is extant but uncommon in Baja California, Mexico, and into Nevada. However, most observations of this species occur in southern California in coastal areas. The overwintering habitat of this bumblebee is not known, but it is believed that they have similar behaviors to other bumblebees in this respect, overwintering under leaf litter or soft soil.

Crotch's bumblebee inhabits grassland and scrub areas, requiring a hotter and drier environment than other bumblebee species, and can only tolerate a very narrow range of climatic conditions. Crotch's bumblebee nests underground, often in abandoned rodent dens. It is a nonmigratory species of bumblebee.

Diet
Its food plants include milkweeds, dustymaidens, lupines, medics, phacelias, and sages. It also feeds on snapdragons, Clarkia, poppies, and wild buckwheats. Milkweed is a favorite nectar source of Crotch's bumblebee. Due to the role of bumblebees as pollinators, monarch butterflies benefit from this situation. Due to the wide range of host plants visited by Crotch's bumblebee, it is characterized as a dietary generalist.

Conservation 
Crotch's bumblebee is an endangered species that was last evaluated by IUCN in April 2014. In 2019, the species' global status was listed as imperiled. The rationale provided was as follows: "This species has a modest range extent and within that, it is restricted to a very limited climatic range. Observations since 2008 indicate a retraction from the northern portion of its range. Relative abundance has also declined".

Its current range area is estimated at 144,003 km2. This bumblebee was once common in the Central Valley of California, but is now scarce in that area. The Xerces Society (2019) reports a relative abundance decline of 98% over the last decade; the group has also estimated an 80% decline in the relative persistence of the bumblebee in its range during this time. Regions within the Crotch's bumblebee range have experienced urbanization and intensive agriculture, events that are thought to have contributed to the decline of the species. Another prominent issue for this bumblebee species is that of climate change; as stated above, this species is a major climatic specialist compared to other bumblebees, so climate change and increasing aridity are significant threats to Crotch's bumblebee. Additionally, insecticides are problematic for the health of B. crotchii, especially neonicotinoids, which are very commonly applied. Moreover, the toxicity to bumblebees from these types of pesticides lasts for several months, meaning the negative impacts can be observed over the long-term. Inbreeding is probably also becoming problematic, especially as B. crotchii populations continue to decline.

A petition was submitted by the Xerces society, Defenders of Wildlife, and the Center for Food Safety to the California Fish and Game Commission in October 2018 to list Crotch's bumblebee and three others as endangered under the California Endangered Species Act. The petition provides probably the most up to date figures on the status of Crotch's bumblebee: "Current range size relative to historic range (EOO): 74.67% (25.33% decline), persistence in current range relative to historic occupancy: 20.48% (79.52% decline), current relative abundance compared to historic relative abundance: 2.32% (97.68% decline), average decline: 67.51%".

The California Department of Fish and Wildlife evaluated this petition in a report for The California Fish and Game Commission completed in April 2019. In regard to Crotch's bumblebee, the report states that: "In completing its Petition Evaluation, the Department has determined the Petition provides sufficient scientific information to indicate the petitioned action may be warranted. Therefore, the Department recommends the Commission accept the Petition for further consideration under CESA".

On June 12, 2019 the California Fish and Game Commission voted to add the four bumblebees, including Crotch's bumblebee, to the list of protected species under the California Endangered Species Act. A subsequent legal challenge of the CESA's definition of a fish as "a wild fish, mollusk, crustacean, invertebrate, amphibian, or part, spawn, or ovum of any of those animals" was eventually overruled, because the explicit intent was for all invertebrates (therefore including insects) to be qualified for protection under this legal definition. This is an important step because there are no presently formal protections in place for Crotch's bumblebee species despite its well-characterized decline.

References

Bumblebees
Fauna of the Baja California Peninsula
Endangered fauna of California
Insects described in 1878